Deng Conghao (1920–1998) was a Chinese chemist and educator. He served as President of Shandong University from June 1984 until November 1986.

References

1920 births
1998 deaths
Educators from Jiangxi
Members of the Chinese Academy of Sciences
People from Fuzhou, Jiangxi
Presidents of Shandong University
Xiamen University alumni